The Kids To The Country (KTC) is an American non-profit program that began in the Bronx, New York by Plenty International to provide assistance to vulnerable and underprivileged children until conditions in the area improved enough to withdraw the project. Re-established in Nashville, Tennessee in 1986, KTC is a program to reduce anger, violence and fear in some of the country's most at-risk urban children. Through various nature activities, the KTC program offers urban youth the opportunity to get out of troubled situations and develop a connection to nature. Summer programs are typically five weeks and include swimming, riding canoes and horses, crafts, hiking and studying the native landscape, gardening, star gazing, playing musical instruments, and telling stories. 

A majority of the program's participants come from homeless shelters, refugee centers, and low-income neighborhoods. 

Over 2,800 children have participated since Plenty International's inception of the program.

References

External links 
 Plenty International
 Kids to the Country
 The Farm Community

Children's sport